Sitting volleyball is a form of volleyball for athletes with a disability. As opposed to standing volleyball, sitting volleyball players must sit on the floor to play.

History
Sitting volleyball was invented in the Netherlands by the Dutch Sport Committee in 1956 as a rehabilitation sport for injured soldiers.  
In 1958,  the first international sitting volleyball contact was held between Germany and Dutch clubteams. It was created as a combination of volleyball and sitzball, a German sport with no net and seated players. Standing volleyball first appeared in the Toronto 1976 Paralympic games as a demonstration sport for athletes with impaired mobility, and both standing and sitting volleyball became officially included as medal sports in the Paralympic games at Arnhem in 1980. Women’s sitting volleyball was added for the Athens 2004 Paralympic Games.  After the London 2012 games, VolleySLIDE was founded by Matt Rogers to promote and develop the sport globally.  Eight men's and eight women's teams competed in the 2020 Tokyo Paralympic Games.

Rules

The court is  meters with a 2-metre (6.6-foot) attack line. The rules are the same as the original form of volleyball with the exceptions that players must have at least one buttock in contact with the floor whenever they make contact with the ball and it is also possible to block the serve.
Athletes with the following disabilities are eligible to compete in sitting volleyball: athletes with amputations, spinal cord injuries, cerebral palsy, brain injuries and stroke. Classifications of these athletes by disability are placed into two categories: MD and D. MD stands for "Minimally Disabled," and D stands for “Disabled.”  While Minimally Disabled athletes have lost only a fraction of their muscular strength and flexibility in a joint preventing them from successfully playing standing volleyball, Disabled athletes have lost all of their muscular strength and flexibility in that joint. Only two MD players are allowed on the roster for the Paralympic Games and only one is allowed on the court at a time; this is to keep the competition fair between rival teams. The rest of the team must be classified as D players.
Skills are largely identical to the sport of volleyball and the following game terminology apply:
 Ace - A serve that lands in the opponent's court without being touched.
 Attack - An attempt by a player to win a point by hitting the ball over the net.
 Attack line - In indoor volleyball, a line three metres from the net which marks the limit for where a back-row player may advance to hit a ball from above the net.
 Back-row player - In indoor volleyball, any of three players positioned at the back of the court.
 Block - To block an opposing player from spiking the ball by jumping at the net with arms in the air.
 Boom - In beach volleyball, a spike straight down into the sand (slang).
 Centre line - In indoor volleyball, the imaginary line running directly under the net and dividing the court in half.
 Chuck - To push or throw the ball rather than hit it (slang).
 Court - The playing area.
 Crossing space - The zone above the net and between two antennae through which the ball must pass during a rally.
 Dig - A defensive move in which both arms are placed together in an attempt to bounce a hard-hit ball up into the air.
 End line - A back boundary line of the court.
 Facial - A boom or spike that hits an opponent in the face (slang).
 Fault - A foul or error which results in the loss of the rally.
 Front-row player - In indoor volleyball, any of three players positioned closest to the net.
 Front zone - In indoor volleyball, the area between the net and the attack line.
 Ground - To hit the ball to the ground, preferably on the other team's court.
 Heater - A hard-hit or spiked ball (slang).
 Hit - To touch the ball as an offensive player, one of three "hits" allowed a team in getting the ball back over the net.
 Hold - To let the ball settle into the hands briefly on a shot instead of releasing it immediately.
 Joust - A joust occurs above the net between two or more opposing players that forces the ball to become stationary. Point is replayed. 
 Kill - To smash the ball overarm into the opponent's court; also called a "spike".
 Kong - A one-handed block, named after King Kong's style of swatting biplanes in the original King Kong movie (slang).
 Libero - In indoor volleyball, a substitute defensive player especially adept at digging.
 Lip - A good dig (slang).
 Match - A series of sets to determine a winner.
 Mintonette - The original name for volleyball.
 Missile - A spike or serve hit out of bounds (slang).
 Pass - the attempt by a team to properly handle the opponent's serve, or any form of attack.
 Rally - The exchange of plays that decides each point.
 Rotate - In indoor volleyball, to move to the next position on the floor in a clockwise manner.
 Screen - To impede the opponent's view of the ball during the serve.
 Serve - The stroke used to put the ball in play at the start of each rally.
 Set - 1. The part of a match completed when one side has scored enough points to win a single contest. 2. To position the ball so a teammate can attack.
 Setter - A player who excels in setting up teammates to attack.
 Sideline - A side boundary line on a court.
 Spade - An ace (slang).
 Spike - To smash the ball overarm into the opponent's court; also called a "kill".
 Windmill Spike (hand movement during Spike follows motion of windmill).,

Members
World ParaVolley

List also includes former members (national teams that took part in previous major tournaments).

|}

Championships

Paralympics

Sitting volleyball was first demonstrated at the Summer Paralympic Games in 1976 and was introduced as a full Paralympic event in 1980. The 2000 games was the last time standing volleyball appeared on the Paralympic programme. The women's sitting volleyball event introduction followed in the 2004 Paralympic Games.

World ParaVolley (formerly WOVD) World Championships

Sitting

Men's Sitting - Past winners

 Ranking

Women's Sitting - Past winners

 Ranking

Standing

Beach

ParaVolley Europe (formerly ECVD) European Championships

Men's Sitting - Past winners

Women's Sitting - Past winners

See also
Pieter Joon - World Organization Volleyball for Disabled (WOVD) founder and former president
Volleyball variations
Volleyball at the Summer Paralympics

References

External links

VolleySlide
Sitting volleyball on International Paralympic Committee website
Beijing 2008 Paralympic Sitting Volleyball Information with an Australian slant from accessibility.com.au - includes nomination criteria for the 2008 Australian Paralympic Volleyball squad.

 
Volleyball variations
Volleyball